The Other Lover is a 1985 American made-for-television drama film directed by Robert Ellis Miller and executive produced by Larry A. Thompson.

Plot
Jack Hollander is a novelist, infuriated with his publicists for putting a soft-porn cover on his latest novel. He confronts marketing director Claire Fielding and demands to know what the cover has to do with the book itself. She admits she didn't read the book before deciding what cover should be used, but assures him it will only help selling the book.

Despite of their strong different opinions, they are drawn to each other and start a romance. The problem is Claire is already married to Peter and has two children, Alson and Maggie. Claire is torn between choosing Jack and Peter. With Peter, she has a steady and quite happy marriage. However, the romance has been gone for a long time and all they do is worry about the bills and children. If she chooses Jack, she has a passionate and rejuvenating affair, without assurance of what the future will offer.

Release
The movie debuted on the CBS on the evening of Tuesday, September 24, 1985.

Cast
 Lindsay Wagner as Claire Fielding
 Jack Scalia as Jack Hollander
 Max Gail as Sal
 Millie Perkins as Kate
 John Bennett Perry as Peter Fielding
 Shannen Doherty as Alson Fielding
Jaime Lyn Hart as Maggie Fielding

References

External links

1985 films
1985 television films
1985 drama films
American drama television films
CBS network films
Films directed by Robert Ellis Miller
1980s English-language films
1980s American films